Corporate Flesh Party is the debut album by English rock band My Passion.  Released in May 2009 on the band's Style Suicide Record Label as a limited edition run of 2,000 copies, it was re-released in June 2009 on Mascot Records.  Promo music videos have been released for the tracks 'Day Of The Bees' and 'Crazy & Me'.

Track listing 
 "Crazy & Me" – 3:58
 "Play Dirty" – 3:37
 "Day Of The Bees" – 4:00
 "Never Everland" – 4:16
 "Winter For Lovers" – 4:55
 "Hot In The Dolls House" – 4:16
 "After Calais" – 2:06
 "Thanks For Nothing" – 3:50
 "The Fabulous Blood Disco" – 4:16
 "Plastic Flesh Garden" – 4:25
 "Vultures Are People Too" – 4:16

Personnel 
 Laurence René - Vocals, Guitar
 John Be - Guitar
 Simon Rowlands - Bass
 Jonathan Gaskin - Guitar, Vocals, Electronics/Synth, Drums

References 

2009 albums
My Passion albums